The Michael Shaara Award for Excellence in Civil War Fiction is an annual literary award awarded to the writer of a work of fiction related to the American Civil War. The award was started by Jeffrey ("Jeff") Shaara, (b. 1952),  and named for his father, the writer of historical fiction Michael Shaara, (1928–1988), who won the 1975 Pulitzer Prize for the 1974 novel of the American Civil War, The Killer Angels, about the Battle of Gettysburg, in Gettysburg, Pennsylvania, and later made into the Ted Turner-produced movie in 1993, Gettysburg, by director Ronald Maxwell. The original novel and movie later became the inspiration for son Jeff's prequel Gods and Generals, (1996), and sequel The Last Full Measure, (1998),  set of novels of which Gods and Generals was also made into a film in 2003 by Turner and Maxwell focusing on the earlier part of the war with  Confederate General Thomas J. ("Stonewall") Jackson. The younger Shaara has also since written several other novels and series of historical fiction about the American Revolutionary War, Mexican–American War, World War I and World War II. He later returned to the theme of the Civil War with a set of works focusing on the western theatre of the war, (Trans-Mississippi Theatre).

The $5,000 was first awarded in 1997, at the United States Civil War Center at Louisiana State University in Baton Rouge, Louisiana. In 2004, it was moved to the Civil War Institute at Gettysburg College in Gettysburg, Pennsylvania.

Award winners
 1997: Madison Jones, Nashville 1864
 1998: Donald McCaig, Jacob's Ladder: A Story of Virginia During the Civil War
 1999: Robert J. Mrazek, Stonewall's Gold
 2000: Richard Slotkin, Abe: A Novel of the Young Lincoln
 2001: Marly Youmans, The Wolf Pit
 2002: Marie Jakober, Only Call Us Faithful
 2003: no award given
 2004: Philip Lee Williams, A Distant Flame
 2005: no award given
 2006: E. L. Doctorow, The March
 2007: Howard Bahr, The Judas Field
 2008: Donald McCaig, Canaan
 2009: Nick Taylor, Disagreement
 2010: Cornelia Nixon, Jarrettsville
 2011: Robin Oliveira, My Name is Mary Sutter
 2012: Sharon Ewell Foster, The Resurrection of Nat Turner, Part One: The Witnesses
 2013: Peter Troy, May the Road Rise Up to Meet You
 2014: Dennis McFarland, Nostalgia

References

American literary awards
Historical fiction awards
Awards established in 1997